Giovanni Carlo Antonelli (1612 – 20 April 1694) was a Roman Catholic prelate who served as Bishop of Ferentino (1677–1694).

Biography
Giovanni Carlo Antonelli was born in Velletri, Italy in 1612 and ordained a priest on 29 July 1635.
On 11 January 1677, he was appointed during the papacy of Pope Innocent XI as Bishop of Ferentino. On 24 January 1677, he was consecrated bishop by Fabrizio Spada, Cardinal-Priest of San Callisto, with Francesco Casati, Titular Archbishop of Trapezus, and Domenico Gianuzzi, Titular Bishop of Dioclea in Phrygia, serving as co-consecrators. He served as Bishop of Ferentino until his death on 20 April 1694.

See also 
Catholic Church in Italy

References

External links and additional sources
 (for Chronology of Bishops) 
 (for Chronology of Bishops) 

17th-century Italian Roman Catholic bishops
Bishops appointed by Pope Innocent XI
1612 births
1694 deaths